Before the Deluge is a 1954 French-Italian drama film directed by André Cayatte. It was entered into the 1954 Cannes Film Festival. It was shot at the Billancourt Studios in Paris. The film's sets were designed by the art director Jacques Colombier.

Plot
Four boys and a girl want to get away from their parents and their country because they are afraid of an atomic war. They plan to use a boat to get to an idyllic island. When they realise their savings aren't sufficient they feel it was justified to obtain the required money by committing a crime.

Cast
 Antoine Balpêtré as Monsieur Albert Dutoit (as Balpetre)
 Paul Bisciglia as Jean-Jacques Noblet
 Bernard Blier as Monsieur Marcel Noblet
 Jacques Castelot as Serge de Montesson
 Jacques Chabassol as Jean Arnaud
 Clément Thierry as Philippe Boussard (as Clement-Thierry)
 Roger Coggio as Daniel Epstein
 Léonce Corne as Commissaire Auvain (as Leonce Corne)
 Jacques Fayet as Richard Dutoit
 Paul Frankeur as Monsieur Boussard
 Isa Miranda as Madame Françoise Boussard
 Carlo Ninchi as the presiding judge
 Line Noro as Madame Arnaud (as Line Noro de la Comédie Française)
 Marcel Pérès as Inspecteur Mallingré (as Marcel Peres)
 Albert Rémy as waiter at the café (as Albert Remy)
 Delia Scala as Josette
 André Valmy as the second police inspecteur (as Andre Valmy)
 Julien Verdier as the night watchman
 Marina Vlady as Liliane Noblet
 Maria Zanoli as Madame Dutoit (as Maria Emma Zanolli)

References

External links

1954 films
1954 drama films
1950s French-language films
Italian drama films
French black-and-white films
Films directed by André Cayatte
French drama films
Films shot at Billancourt Studios
Italian black-and-white films
1950s French films
1950s Italian films
French-language Italian films